Brian O'Neal Jenkins (born March 4, 1971) is an American football coach.  He was the head football coach at Alabama State University, a position he had held since 2015.  Jenkins served as the head football coach at Bethune–Cookman University from 2010 to 2014.  His team completed the 2010 season with a record of 10 wins and 2 losses.  In his first year, his team was declared the Mid-Eastern Athletic Conference co-champions and the team qualified for the 2010 NCAA Division I Football Championship Series playoffs.

Head coaching record

Notes

References

External links
 Alabama State profile

1971 births
Living people
American football running backs
American football wide receivers
Alabama State Hornets football coaches
Bethune–Cookman Wildcats football coaches
Bowling Green Falcons football coaches
Cincinnati Bearcats football players
Eastern Illinois Panthers football coaches
Edward Waters Tigers football coaches
Frankfurt Galaxy coaches
Louisiana Ragin' Cajuns football coaches
Rutgers Scarlet Knights football coaches
Western Kentucky Hilltoppers football coaches
Coaches of American football from Florida
Players of American football from Fort Lauderdale, Florida
African-American coaches of American football
African-American players of American football
20th-century African-American sportspeople
21st-century African-American sportspeople